Komodo is one of the 17,508 islands that comprise the Republic of Indonesia. The island is particularly notable as the habitat of the Komodo dragon, the largest lizard on Earth, which is named after the island. Komodo Island has a surface area of 390 square kilometres and a human population of over two thousand. The people of the island are descendants of former convicts who were exiled to the island and who have mixed with Bugis from Sulawesi. The people are primarily adherents of Islam but there are also Christian and Hindu congregations.

Komodo is part of the Lesser Sunda chain of islands and forms part of the Komodo National Park. In addition, the island is a popular destination for diving. Administratively, it is part of the East Nusa Tenggara province.

Description
Komodo is part of the Lesser Sunda chain of islands and forms part of the Komodo National Park. It lies between the substantially larger neighboring islands Sumbawa to the west and Flores to the east. The island's surface area covers 390 square kilometres.  Komodo Island is home to the Komodo Dragon, the largest lizard on earth.

History
The earliest stories (among Westerners) of a dragon-like animal existing in the region circulated widely and attracted considerable attention.  But no Westerner visited the island to check the story until official interest was sparked in the early 1910s by stories from Dutch sailors based in Flores in East Nusa Tenggara about a mysterious creature. The creature was allegedly a dragon which inhabited a small island in the Lesser Sunda Islands (the main island of which is Flores).

The Dutch sailors reported that the creature measured up to seven metres (twenty-three feet) in length with a large body and mouth which constantly breathed fire. It burnt them and so they could not continue the investigation. It was believed then that the odd creature could fly. Hearing the reports, Lieutenant Steyn van Hensbroek, an official of the Dutch Colonial Administration in Flores, planned a trip to Komodo Island to continue the search himself. He armed himself, and accompanied by a team of soldiers, he landed on the island. After a few days, Hensbroek managed to kill one of the lizards to investigate.

Van Hensbroek took the dragon to headquarters where measurements were taken. It was approximately 2.1 metres (6.9 feet) long, with a shape very similar to that of a lizard. More samples were then photographed by Peter A. Ouwens, the Director of the Zoological Museum and Botanical Gardens in Bogor, Java. The records that Ouwens made are the first reliable documentation of details about what is now called the Komodo dragon (or Komodo monitor).

Ouwens was keen to obtain additional samples. He recruited hunters who killed two dragons measuring 3.1 metres and 3.35 metres as well as capturing two pups, each measuring less than one metre. Ouwens carried out studies on the samples and concluded that the Komodo dragon was not a flame-thrower but was a type of monitor lizard. Research results were published in 1912. Ouwens named the giant lizard Varanus komodoensis. Realizing the significance of the dragons on Komodo Island as an endangered species, the Dutch government issued a regulation on the protection of the lizards on Komodo Island in 1915.

In 1926, W. Douglas Burden, F.J. Defoisse, and Emmett Reid Dunn collected specimens for the American Museum of Natural History.  Burden's chapter "The Komodo Dragon", in Look to the Wilderness, describes the expedition, the dragon's habitat and its behavior.

The Komodo dragon became something of a living legend. In the decades since the Komodo was discovered, various scientific expeditions from a range of countries have carried out field research on the dragons on Komodo Island.

People
Komodo has a human population of over two thousand, spread out over the island and in the main Komodo village. The native population of Komodo, the Komodo people, has been extinct since the 1980s. The present day people of the island are descendants of former convicts who were exiled to Komodo and who have mixed with Bugis from Sulawesi. The population is primarily adherents of Islam but there are also Christian and Hindu congregations.

Ecology
Komodo is part of the Lesser Sundas deciduous forests ecoregion. The island is also a popular destination for diving and it has been included into the controversial New7Wonders of Nature list since November 11, 2011.

Fauna

The Komodo dragon, the world's largest living lizard, takes its name from the island. A type of monitor lizard, it inhabits Komodo Island and some of the smaller surrounding islands, as well as part of western Flores. Javan deer also inhabit the island, though they are not native. Other animals include water buffalo, banded pigs, civets, cockatoo and macaques.

Pink beach

Komodo contains a beach with "pink" sand, one of only seven in the world. The sand appears pink because it is a mixture of white sand combined with red sand, formed from pieces of Foraminifera.

2020 closure

In April 2019, Indonesian authorities announced a plan to close Komodo Island to tourism for a limited period to allow for conservation efforts amid concerns over animal-smuggling.  In July 2019, it was confirmed that the island would be closed as from the beginning of 2020. In September 2019, the park attracted further controversy when tourists complained that their guides were encouraging 'selfies' with Komodo dragons. The Governor of Nusa Tenggara Timur province, Viktor Laiskodat, said that a budget of Rp 100 billion (around $US 7.2 million) would be provided to support the conservation program. The plan is controversial: Governor Laiskodat has suggested that an expensive entrance fee be charged to foreign tourists while local villagers who live on Komodo Island are worried about the possible loss of income.

See also

 List of islands of Indonesia

External links
 Komodo - images & guide

References

Lesser Sunda Islands
Inner Banda Arc
Komodo National Park
Populated places in Indonesia
Islands of Indonesia